Zámečník or Zamecnik is a Czech language occupational surname  for a locksmith and may refer to:
John Stepan Zamecnik (1872–1953), American composer and conductor
Paul Zamecnik (1912–2009), American scientist

References 

Czech-language surnames
Occupational surnames